The 1942 WANFL season was the 58th season of the Western Australian National Football League. Whilst the previous two seasons had been increasingly affected by the drift of players to the services, the 1941/1942 off-season saw the Imperial Japanese Navy and air force move into the north of Western Australia, bombing many northwestern settlements.

Consequently, virtually all senior WANFL players had been enlisted to war work or the military. By the new year the WANFL was aware that normal senior league football would be impossible, and the league decided after debate late in February to conduct a competition for those too young for military service, with players required to be under the age of eighteen on 1 October 1942. Teams were largely drawn from the Young Sports’ Temperance League, which had fifty-three clubs in 1941. Associated with the under-age competition was the temporary abolition of district football with the expectation that when peace returned players would return to the club for which they would ordinarily be zoned.

Bassendean Oval was taken over by the military before the season started, as were early in the season Fremantle Oval and the WACA – though both were vacated a third of the way through.

When the season was planned, it was proposed to exclude Perth and Swan Districts, who had been the bottom two clubs in 1941 and lacked adequate junior players. Perth eventually fought for inclusion, resulting in a seven-team competition with a bye until the clubs had played each other twice, after which it was announced the bottom team would drop out and, as in the WAFL between 1911 and 1913 and the 1943 VFL season, a bye-less draw was made for the last five rounds. Perth were the team to drop out, after winning two early matches, whilst 1941 premiers West Perth proved the strongest team all through the season and possessed not only the premiership but also the Sandover Medallist (a future Swan Districts player), the leading goalkicker and a future postwar star in Fred Buttsworth.

A notable tragedy occurred in August when high-flying key forward John Hetherington of Subiaco, whose superb marking won rave reviews and gave him fifty-four goals in twelve matches, was struck down by polio and became a paraplegic despite the problem being initially seen as back trouble.

Home-and-away season

Round 1

Round 2

Round 3

Round 4

Round 5

Round 6

Round 7

Round 8

Round 9

Round 10

Round 11

Round 12

Round 13

Round 14

Round 15

Round 16

Round 17

Round 18

Round 19

Ladder

Finals

First semi-final

Second semi-final

Preliminary final

Grand Final

References

External links
Official WAFL website
Western Australian National Football League (WANFL), 1942

West Australian Football League seasons
WANFL